Achille de Harlay de Sancy, CO (1581, Paris26 November 1646), the son of Nicolas de Harlay, seigneur de Sancy, was a French diplomat and intellectual who was noted as a linguist and orientalist. He entered Church service, becoming the Bishop of Saint-Malo.

Life
Harlay was educated for a career in the Roman Catholic Church, but, though he remained a friend to his fellow pupil Armand-Jean du Plessis, who became Cardinal Richelieu, he resigned his vocation to become a soldier after the death of his elder brother in 1601. For several years, from 1610 to 1619, he was French Ambassador to the Ottoman Empire, where he amassed a fortune of some 16,000 sterling by doubtful means, and was bastinadoed by order of Sultan Mustafa I for his frauds. One of his secretaries, named Lefevre, wrote a manuscript Voyage de M. de Sancy, ambassadeur pour le Roi en Levant, fait par terre depuis Raguse jusques à Constantinople l'an 1611.

On his return to France, Harlay joined the French Oratory and became a priest. When François de Bassompierre was sent to England in 1627 to regulate the differences between Queen Henrietta Maria of France and her husband King Charles I of England, Harlay de Sancy was attached to the queen's ecclesiastical household, but the king secured his dismissal.

Harlay was named the Bishop of Saint-Malo in 1631, for which he was consecrated in January 1632. He served in this post until his resignation on 20 November 1646. He died six days later.

References

1581 births
1646 deaths
Clergy from Paris
French nobility
Linguists from France
French orientalists
Ambassadors of France to the Ottoman Empire
17th-century French diplomats
French Oratory
Bishops of Saint-Malo
17th-century French Roman Catholic bishops
French male non-fiction writers